The Divine Sacrifice is a lost 1918 silent film drama directed by George Archainbaud and starring stage star Kitty Gordon. Gordon's real life daughter, Vera Beresford, has a role in the picture.

Cast
Kitty Gordon - Madeline Spencer
Selene Johnson - Helen Carewe
Jean Angelo - David Carewe
Frank Goldsmith - Rupert Spencer
Charles Dungan - Dr. Merwin
Mildred Beckwith - Linda
Vera Beresford - June
Ethel Burner - Timmie
Harry Frazer - Robert Spencer

References

External links
The Divine Sacrifice at IMDb.com

1918 films
American silent feature films
Lost American films
Films directed by George Archainbaud
Films based on American novels
World Film Company films
American black-and-white films
Silent American drama films
1918 drama films
1918 lost films
Lost drama films
1910s American films